Anti-clericalism is opposition to religious authority, typically in social or political matters. Historical anti-clericalism has mainly been opposed to the influence of Roman Catholicism. Anti-clericalism is related to secularism, which seeks to separate the church from public and political life.

Some have opposed clergy on the basis of moral corruption, institutional issues and/or disagreements in religious interpretation, such as during the Protestant Reformation. Anti-clericalism became extremely violent during the French Revolution, because revolutionaries claimed the church played a pivotal role in the systems of oppression which led to it. Many clerics were killed, and French revolutionary governments tried to put priests under the control of the state by making them employees. 

Anti-clericalism appeared in Catholic Europe throughout the 19th century, in various forms, and later in Canada, Cuba, and Latin America.

According to the Pew Research Center several post-communist states are current practitioners of political anti-clericalism, including Uzbekistan, Azerbaijan, Kazakhstan, Tajikistan, Kyrgyzstan, Turkmenistan, Vietnam, China and North Korea.

Europe

France

Revolution
The Civil Constitution of the Clergy was passed on July 12, 1790, requiring all clerics to swear allegiance to the French government and, by extension, to the increasingly anti-clerical National Constituent Assembly. All but seven of the 160 bishops refused the oath, as did about half of the parish priests. Persecution of the clergy and of the faithful was the first trigger of the rebellion; the second being conscription. Nonjuring priests were exiled or imprisoned and women on their way to Mass were beaten in the streets.

The anti-clericalism during the French Revolution initially began with attacks on church corruption and the wealth of the higher clergy, an action with which even many Christians could identify, since the Roman Catholic church held a dominant role in pre-revolutionary France.  During a two-year period known as the Reign of Terror, the episodes of anti-clericalism grew more violent than Europe would see until the rise of state atheism in communist Eastern Europe. The new revolutionary authorities suppressed the church; abolished the Catholic monarchy; nationalized church property; exiled 30,000 priests and killed hundreds more. Many churches were converted into "temples of reason", in which  services were held. There has been much scholarly debate over whether the movement was popularly motivated. As part of the campaign to dechristianize France, in October 1793 the Christian calendar was replaced with one reckoning from the date of the Revolution, and Festivals of Liberty, Reason and the Supreme Being were scheduled.  New forms of moral religion emerged, including the deistic Cult of the Supreme Being and France's first established state sponsored atheistic Cult of Reason, with all churches not devoted to these being closed. In April and May 1794, the government mandated the observance of a festival of the Cult of the Supreme Being. When anti-clericalism became a clear goal of French revolutionaries, counter-revolutionaries seeking to restore tradition and the Ancien Régime took up arms, particularly in the War in the Vendée (1793 to 1796). Local people often resisted dechristianization and forced members of the clergy who had resigned to conduct Mass again. Eventually, Maximilien Robespierre and the Committee of Public Safety denounced the dechristianization campaign and tried to establish their own religion, without the superstitions of Catholicism.

When Pope Pius VI took sides against the revolution in the First Coalition (1792–1797), Napoleon Bonaparte invaded Italy (1796). French troops imprisoned the Pope in 1797, and he died after six weeks of captivity.
After a change of heart, Napoleon then re-established the Catholic Church in France with the signing of the Concordat of 1801, and banned the Cult of the Supreme Being.
Many anti-clerical policies continued. When Napoleonic armies entered a territory, monasteries were often sacked and church property secularized.

Third Republic
A further phase of anti-clericalism occurred in the context of the French Third Republic and its dissensions with the Catholic Church. Prior to the 1905 French law on the Separation of the Churches and the State, the Catholic Church enjoyed preferential treatment from the French state (formally along with the Jewish, Lutheran and Calvinist minority religions, but in practice with much more influence than those). During the 19th century, public schools employed primarily priests as teachers, and religion was taught in schools (teachers were also obliged to lead the class to Mass). In 1881–1882 Jules Ferry's government passed the Jules Ferry laws, establishing free education (1881) and mandatory and lay education (1882), giving the basis of French public education. The Third Republic (1871–1940) firmly established itself after the 16 May 1877 crisis triggered by the Catholic Legitimists who wished for a return to the Ancien Régime.

During the 1880s, several anti-clerical international gatherings took place in Paris, leading to the establishment of the Fédération nationale de la libre pensée, a strongly anti-clerical society regrouping socialists, anarchists and liberals engaged for the separation of State and Churches.

In 1880 and 1882 Benedictine teaching monks were effectively exiled. This was not completed until 1901.

A law of 7 July 1904 preventing religious congregations from teaching any longer, and the 1905 law on separation of state and church, were enacted under the government of Radical-Socialist Émile Combes. Alsace-Lorraine was not subjected to these laws as it was part of the German Empire then.

In the Affaire des Fiches (1904-1905), it was discovered that the anti-clerical War Minister of the Combes government, General Louis André, was determining promotions based on the French Masonic Grand Orient's card index on public officials, detailing which were Catholic and who attended Mass, with a view to preventing their promotions.

In the years following their relocations, boarding schools of congregants were accused by some senators of trying to "recruit" French youth from abroad, placing the French Republic "in jeopardy":

Republicans' anti-clericalism softened after the First World War as the Catholic right-wing began to accept the Republic and secularism, which aimed to prevent socialist parties. However, the theme of subsidized private schools in France, which are overwhelmingly Catholic but whose teachers draw pay from the state, remains a sensitive issue in French politics and the Fédération Nationale de la Libre-Pensée, now commonly associated with the anti-clerical far-left, maintains its strongly anti-clerical stance.

Austria (Holy Roman Empire)
Emperor Joseph II (emperor 1765–1790) opposed what he called "contemplative" religious institutions – reclusive Catholic institutions that he perceived as doing nothing positive for the community. His policy towards them are included in what is called Josephinism.

Joseph decreed that Austrian bishops could not communicate directly with the Curia. More than 500 of 1,188 monasteries in Austro-Slav lands (and a hundred more in Hungary) were dissolved, and 60 million florins taken by the state. This wealth was used to create 1,700 new parishes and welfare institutions.

The education of priests was taken from the Church as well. Joseph established six state-run "General Seminaries". In 1783, a Marriage Patent treated marriage as a civil contract rather than a religious institution.

Catholic historians have claimed that there was an alliance between Joseph and anti-clerical Freemasons.

Germany

The Kulturkampf (literally "culture struggle") refers to German policies in reducing the role and power of the Catholic Church in Prussia, enacted from 1871 to 1878 by the Prime Minister of Prussia, Otto von Bismarck.

Bismarck accelerated the Kulturkampf, which did not extend to the other German states such as Bavaria (where Catholics were in a majority). As one scholar put it, "the attack on the church included a series of Prussian, discriminatory laws that made Catholics feel understandably persecuted within a predominantly Protestant nation." Jesuits, Franciscans, Dominicans and other orders were expelled in the culmination of twenty years of anti-Jesuit and antimonastic hysteria.

In 1871, the Catholic Church comprised 36.5% of the population of the German Empire, including millions of Germans in the west and South, as well as the vast majority of Poles. In this newly founded Empire, Bismarck sought to appeal to liberals and Protestants (62% of the population) by reducing the political and social influence of the Catholic Church.

Priests and bishops who resisted the Kulturkampf were arrested or removed from their positions.  By the height of anti-Catholic measures, half of the Prussian bishops were in prison or in exile, a quarter of the parishes had no priest, half the monks and nuns had left Prussia, a third of the monasteries and convents were closed, 1800 parish priests were imprisoned or exiled, and thousands of laypeople were imprisoned for helping the priests.

The Kulturkampf backfired, as it energized the Catholics to become a political force in the Centre party and revitalized Polish resistance. The Kulturkampf ended about 1880 with a new pope Leo XIII willing to negotiate with Bismarck. Bismarck broke with the Liberals over religion and over their opposition to tariffs; He won Centre party support on most of his conservative policy positions, especially his attacks against Socialism.

Italy
Anti-clericalism in Italy is connected with reaction against the absolutism of the Papal States, overthrown in 1870. For a long time, the pope required Catholics not to participate in the public life of the Kingdom of Italy that had invaded the Papal States to complete the unification of Italy, prompting the pope to declare himself a "prisoner" in the Vatican. Some politicians that had played important roles in this process, such as Giuseppe Garibaldi and Camillo Benso, conte di Cavour, were known to be hostile to the temporal and political power of the Church.  Throughout the history of Liberal Italy, relations between the Italian government and the Church remained acrimonious, and anti-clericals maintained a prominent position in the ideological and political debates of the era.  Tensions eased between church and state in the 1890s and early 1900s as a result of both sides' mutual hostility toward the burgeoning Socialist movement.  Initially also anticlerical, fascist Benito Mussolini tempered such rhetoric to win support from Catholics and later as dictator, official hostility between the Holy See and the Italian state was finally settled by Pope Pius XI and him: the Lateran Accords were finalised in 1929.

After World War II, anti-clericalism was embodied by the Italian Communist (PCI) and Italian Socialist (PSI) parties, in opposition to the Vatican-backed party Christian Democracy (DC). Since the PSI joined DC-led coalition governments, the DC under Aldo Moro turned centre-left. In 1978, with support of the PSI, the DC-led coalition government legalized abortion despite strong opposition from the Catholic Church and DC conservative factions.

The revision of the Lateran treaties during the 1980s by the PSI Prime Minister Bettino Craxi, removed the status of "official religion" of the Catholic Church, but still granted a series of provisions in favour of the Church, such as the eight per thousand law, the teaching of religion in schools, and other privileges.

Since the 1990s, the Catholic Church has took a more aggressive stance in Italian politics, in particular through Cardinal Camillo Ruini, who often made his voice heard commenting the political debate and indicating the official line of the Church on various matters. This interventionism increased with the papacy of Benedict XVI, culminating in the 2008 Italian political crisis caused due to Catholic politicians withdrawing their support from the government. Anti-clericalism, however, is not the official stance of most parties (with the exception of the Italian Radicals, who, however identify as laicist), as most party leaders consider it an electoral disadvantage to openly contradict the Church: since the demise of the DC as a single party, practicing Catholic votes are often swinging between the right and the left wing, and are considered to be decisive to win an election. In recent years, the rise of Populist and Anti-establishment politics, combined with a decline in the number of practicing Catholics has contributed to loosening of the Church's grip over Italian politics.

Poland
Your Movement is an anti-clerical party founded in 2011 by politician Janusz Palikot. Palikot's Movement won 10% of the national vote at the 2011 Polish parliamentary election.

Portugal

The fall of the Monarchy in the Republican revolution of 1910 led to another wave of anti-clerical activity. Most church property was put under State control, and the church was not allowed to inherit property. The revolution and the republic allegedly took a "hostile" approach to the issue of church and state separation, like that of the French Revolution, the Spanish Constitution of 1931 and the Mexican Constitution of 1917. As part of the anti-clerical revolution, the bishops were driven from their dioceses, the property of clerics was seized by the state, wearing of the cassock was banned, all minor seminaries were closed and all but five major seminaries. A law of February 22, 1918, permitted only two seminaries in the country, but they had not been given their property back. Religious orders were expelled from the country, including 31 orders comprising members in 164 houses (in 1917 some orders were permitted to form again).  Religious education was prohibited in both primary and secondary school. Religious oaths and church taxes were also abolished.

Spain

The first instance of anti-clerical violence due to political conflict in 19th-century Spain occurred during the Trienio Liberal (Spanish Civil War of 1820–1823). During riots in Catalonia, 20 clergymen were killed by members of the liberal movement in retaliation for the Church's siding with absolutist supporters of Ferdinand VII.

In 1836 following the First Carlist War, the Ecclesiastical Confiscations of Mendizábal promulgated by Juan Álvarez Mendizábal, prime minister of the new regime abolished the major Spanish Convents and Monasteries.

Many years later the Radical Republican Party leader Alejandro Lerroux would distinguish himself by his inflammatory pieces of opinion.

Red Terror 

The Republican government which came to power in Spain in 1931 was based on secular principles. In the first years some laws were passed secularising education, prohibiting religious education in the schools, and expelling the Jesuits from the country. On Pentecost 1932, Pope Pius XI protested against these measures and demanded restitution. He asked the Catholics of Spain to fight with all legal means against the injustices. June 3, 1933, he issued the encyclical Dilectissima Nobis, in which he described the expropriation of all Church buildings, episcopal residences, parish houses, seminaries and monasteries.

By law, they were now property of the Spanish State, to which the Church had to pay rent and taxes continuously in order to use these properties. "Thus the Catholic Church is compelled to pay taxes on what was violently taken from her". Religious vestments, liturgical instruments, statues, pictures, vases, gems and other valuable objects were expropriated as well.

During the Spanish Civil War  of 1936–1939, Catholics largely supported Franco and the Nationalist forces. Anti-clerical assaults called the  Red Terror  by Nationalists, included sacking and burning monasteries and churches and killing 6,832 members of the clergy.

This number comprises:
 13 bishops (from the dioceses of Sigüenza, Lleida, Cuenca, Barbastro Segorbe, Jaén, Ciudad Real, Almería, Guadix, Barcelona, Teruel and the auxiliary of Tarragona);
 4,172 diocesan priests;
 2,364 monks and friars, among them 259 Clarentians, 226 Franciscans, 204 Piarists, 176 Brothers of Mary, 165 Christian Brothers, 155 Augustinians, 132 Dominicans, and 114 Jesuits.
 283 nuns, according to one source, some of whom were badly tortured.

There are accounts of Catholic faithful being forced to swallow rosary beads, thrown down mine shafts and priests being forced to dig their own graves before being buried alive. The Catholic Church has canonized several martyrs of the Spanish Civil War and beatified hundreds more.

Prior to the Falangists joining Francisco Franco's unified alliance of right-wing parties, the party exhibited anti-clerical tendencies, and saw the Catholic Church as an elite institution that presented  an obstacle to the Falangist's full control the state. Despite this, the Falangists had not been involved in any massacres of Catholics, and it went on to support the Church as a result of their alliance to monarchists and other nationalist movements.

Philippines

Philippine anti-clericalism is rooted in the anti-clericalism of 19th-century Spain. José Rizal, a member of the ilustrado class during the Spanish colonial period and one of the most prominent of the Philippines' national heroes held anti-clerical views until his eventual recantation before his day of execution. The Katipunan, the secret society that spearheaded the Philippine Revolution after Rizal's execution, was also noted for its anti-clericalism. After Philippine independence was recognized by the United States, the inclusion of Rizal's novels Noli me tangere and El filibusterismo in the country's formal-education curricula was strongly opposed by the domestic Catholic Church hierarchy.

Rodrigo Duterte, the country's previous president, has adopted a combative verbal stance toward the Church hierarchy and its staunchest supporters. In 2015, he blamed and cursed Pope Francis for the traffic congestion in the national capital; he later apologized and clarified that it was the government's fault and not the pope's. In 2019, he predicted the Church's temporal demise in 25 years. Duterte, however, has underscored that his animosity toward the Church was purely personal and warned the otherwise uninvolved public against taking unethical action against the clergy.

Canada 
In French Canada following the Conquest, much like in Ireland or Poland under foreign rule, the Catholic Church was the sole national institution not under the direct control of the British colonial government. It was also a major marker of social difference from the incoming Anglo-Protestant settlers. French Canadian identity was almost entirely centred around Catholicism, and to a much lesser extent the French language.  However, there was a small anti-clerical movement in French Canada in the early nineteenth drawing inspiration from American and French liberal revolutions.  This group was one current (but by no means the dominant) one in the Parti canadien and its associated Lower Canada Rebellion of 1837. In the more democratic politics that followed the rebellions, the more radical and anti-clerical tendency eventually formed the Parti rouge in 1848.

At the same time in English Canada, a related phenomenon occurred where the primarily Nonconformist (mostly Presbyterian and Methodist) Reform movement conflicted with an Anglican establishment. In Upper Canada, The Reform Movement began as protest against the "establishment" of the Anglican church.

The vastly different religious backgrounds of the Reformers and rouges was one of the factors which prevented them from working together well during the era of two-party coalition government in Canada (1840–1867).  By 1861, however, the two groups fused to create a united Liberal block. After 1867, this party added like-minded reformers from the Maritime provinces, but struggled to win power, especially in still strongly-Catholic Quebec.

Once Wilfrid Laurier became party leader, however, the party dropped its anti-clerical stance and went on to dominate Canadian politics throughout most of the 20th century.  Since that time, Liberal prime ministers have been overwhelmingly Catholic (St. Laurent, both Pierre and Justin Trudeau, Chrétien, Martin), but since the 1960s Liberals have again had a strained relationship with the Catholic church, and have increasingly parted with the Catholic church's teachings on sexual morality, as when Pierre Trudeau legalized homosexuality and streamlined divorce (as justice minister under Pearson), and Martin legalized same-sex marriage.

In Quebec itself, the Quiet Revolution of the 1960s broke the hold of the church on provincial politics.  The Quebec Liberal Party embraced formerly taboo social democratic ideas, and the state intervened in fields once dominated by the church, especially health and education, which were taken over by the provincial government. Quebec is now considered Canada's most secular province.

United States 

Although anti-clericalism is more often spoken of regarding the history or current politics of Latin countries where the Catholic Church was established and where the clergy had privileges, Philip Jenkins notes in his 2003 book The New Anti-Catholicism that the U.S., despite the lack of Catholic establishments, has always had anti-clericals.

Latin America

Of the population of Latin America, about 71% acknowledge allegiance to the Roman Catholic Church. Consequently, about 43% of the world's Catholics inhabit the 'Latin' countries of South, Central and North America.

The slowness to embrace religious freedom in Latin America is related to its colonial heritage and to its post-colonial history. The Aztec, Maya and Inca cultures made substantial use of religious leaders to ideologically support governing authority and power. This pre-existing role of religion as ideological adjunct to the state in pre-Columbian culture made it relatively easy for the Spanish conquistadors to replace native religious structures with those of a Catholicism that was closely linked to the Spanish throne.

Anti-clericalism was a common feature of 19th-century liberalism in Latin America. This anti-clericalism was often purportedly based on the idea that the clergy (especially the prelates who ran the administrative offices of the Church) were hindering social progress in areas such as public education and economic development.

Beginning in the 1820s, a succession of liberal regimes came to power in Latin America. Some members of these liberal regimes sought to imitate the Spain of the 1830s (and revolutionary France of a half-century earlier) in expropriating the wealth of the Catholic Church, and in imitating the 18th-century benevolent despots in restricting or prohibiting the religious orders. As a result, a number of these liberal regimes expropriated Church property and tried to bring education, marriage and burial under secular authority. The confiscation of Church properties and changes in the scope of religious liberties (in general, increasing the rights of non-Catholics and non-observant Catholics, while licensing or prohibiting the orders) generally accompanied secularist and governmental reforms.

Mexico 

The Mexican Constitution of 1824 had required the Republic to prohibit the exercise of any religion other than the Roman Catholic and Apostolic faith.

Reform War 

Starting in 1855, President Benito Juárez issued decrees nationalizing church property, separating church and state, and suppressing religious orders. Church properties were confiscated and basic civil and political rights were denied to religious orders and the clergy.

Cristero War 

More severe laws called Calles Law during the rule of Plutarco Elías Calles eventually led to the Cristero War, an armed peasant rebellion supported by the Catholic Church, against the Mexican government.

Following the Mexican Revolution of 1910, the new Mexican Constitution of 1917 contained further anti-clerical provisions. Article 3 called for secular education in the schools and prohibited the Church from engaging in primary education; Article 5 outlawed monastic orders; Article 24 forbade public worship outside the confines of churches; and Article 27 placed restrictions on the right of religious organizations to hold property. Article 130 deprived clergy members of basic political rights. Many of these laws were resisted, leading to the Cristero Rebellion of 1927–1929. The suppression of the Church included the closing of many churches and the killing of priests. The persecution was most severe in Tabasco under the atheist" governor Tomás Garrido Canabal.

The church-supported armed rebellion only escalated the violence.  US Diplomat Dwight Morrow was brought in to mediate the conflict.  But 1928 saw the assassination of President Alvaro Obregón by Catholic radical José de León Toral, gravely damaging the peace process.

The war had a profound effect on the Church. Between 1926 and 1934 at least 40 priests were killed. Between 1926 and 1934, over 3,000 priests were exiled or assassinated.

Where 4,500 priests served the people before the rebellion, in 1934 there were only 334 priests licensed by the government to serve fifteen million people, the rest having been eliminated by emigration, expulsion and assassination. It appears that ten states were left without any priests.

The Cristero rebels committed their share of violence, which continued even after formal hostilities had ended.  In some of the worst cases, public school teachers were tortured and murdered by the former Cristero rebels. It is calculated that almost 300 rural teachers were murdered in this way between 1935 and 1939.

Ecuador 
This issue was one of the bases for the lasting dispute between Conservatives, who represented primarily the interests of the Sierra and the church, and the Liberals, who represented those of the Costa and anti-clericalism. Tensions came to a head in 1875 when the conservative President Gabriel García Moreno, after being elected to his third term, was allegedly assassinated by anti-clerical Freemasons.

Colombia 

Colombia enacted anti-clerical legislation and its enforcement during more than three decades (1849–84).

La Violencia refers to an era of civil conflict in various areas of the Colombian countryside between supporters of the Colombian Liberal Party and the Colombian Conservative Party, a conflict which took place roughly from 1948 to 1958.

Across the country, militants attacked churches, convents, and monasteries, killing priests and looking for arms, since the conspiracy theory maintained that the religious had guns, and this despite the fact that not a single serviceable weapon was located in the raids.

When their party came to power in 1930, anti-clerical Liberals pushed for legislation to end Church influence in public schools. These Liberals held that the Church and its intellectual backwardness were responsible for a lack of spiritual and material progress in Colombia. Liberal-controlled local, departmental and national governments ended contracts with religious communities who operated schools in government-owned buildings, and set up secular schools in their place. These actions were sometimes violent, and were met by a strong opposition from clerics, Conservatives, and even a good number of more moderate Liberals.

Argentina 
The original Argentine Constitution of 1853 provided that all Argentine presidents must be Catholic and stated that the duty of the Argentine congress was to convert the Indians to Catholicism. All of these provisions have been eliminated with the exception of the mandate to "sustain" Catholicism.

Liberal anti-clericalists of the 1880s established a new pattern of church-state relations in which the official constitutional status of the Church was preserved while the state assumed control of many functions formerly the province of the Church. Conservative Catholics, asserting their role as definers of national values and morality, responded in part by joining in the rightist religio-political movement known as Catholic Nationalism which formed successive opposition parties. This began a prolonged period of conflict between church and state that persisted until the 1940s when the Church enjoyed a restoration of its former status under the presidency of Colonel Juan Perón. Perón claimed that Peronism was the "true embodiment of Catholic social teaching" – indeed, more the embodiment of Catholicism than the Catholic Church itself.

In 1954, Argentina saw extensive destruction of churches, denunciations of clergy and confiscation of Catholic schools as Perón attempted to extend state control over national institutions.

The renewed rupture in church-state relations was completed when Perón was excommunicated. However, in 1955, he was overthrown by a military general who was a leading member of the Catholic Nationalist movement.

Venezuela 
In Venezuela, the government of Antonio Guzmán Blanco (in office from 1870–1877, from 1879–1884, and from 1886–1887) virtually crushed the institutional life of the church, even attempting to legalize the marriage of priests. These anti-clerical policies remained in force for decades afterward.

Cuba 
Cuba, under the rule of atheist Fidel Castro, succeeded in reducing the Church's ability to work by deporting the archbishop and 150 Spanish priests, by discriminating against Catholics in public life and education and by refusing to accept them as members of the Communist Party. The subsequent flight of 300,000 people from the island also helped to diminish the Church there.

Communism 

In the Soviet Union, anti-clericalism was expressed through the state; in the first five years alone after the Bolshevik revolution, 28 bishops and 1,200 priests were executed.

Anti-clericalism in the Islamic world 
Traditionally,  Muslims who are not experts in Islamic jurisprudence (fiqh) are "legally required" in Islam to follow or "imitate" the instructions of the expert, i.e., the mujtahid", (but not in "matters of belief" or usulu 'd-din). to obey or "imitate" in a broad range of matters those who are -- a practice known as taqlid. In practice this means asking a cleric trained in Islamic law for a fatwa on the issue the Muslim is concerned about. 

Following the 1979 Islamic Revolution in Iran -- the one Muslim country where Shia form an overwhelming majority, even more systematic power was given to clerics. Under the doctrine of  rule by Islamic jurists, or velayat-e faqih, Islamic clerics must rule or Islam will whither away. a cleric is head of state and control many powerful governmental positions.

Iran 

During the first democratic revolution of Asia, the Iranian Constitutional Revolution, the Shia Marja Akhund Khurasani and his colleagues theorized a model of religious secularity in the absence of Imam, that still prevails in Shia seminaries. In absence of the ideal ruler, that is Imam al-Mahdi, democracy was the best available option. He considers opposition to constitutional democracy as hostility towards the twelfth Imam. He declared his full support for constitutional democracy and announced that objection to "foundations of constitutionalism" was un-Islamic. According to Akhund, "a rightful religion imposes conditions on the actions and behavior of human beings", which stem from either holy text or logical reasoning, and these constraints are essentially meant to prevent despotism. He believes that an Islamic system of governance can not be established without the infallible Imam leading it. Thus the clergy and modern scholars have concluded that a proper legislation can help reduce the state tyranny and maintain peace and security. He said:

As "sanctioned by sacred law and religion", Akhund believes, a theocratic government can only be formed by the infallible Imam. Aqa Buzurg Tehrani also quoted Akhund Khurasani saying that if there was a possibility of establishment of a truly legitimate Islamic rule in any age, God must end occultation of the Imam of Age. Hence, he refuted the idea of absolute guardianship of jurist. Therefore, according to Akhund, Shia jurists must support the democratic reform. He prefers collective wisdom over individual opinions, and limits the role of jurist to provide religious guidance in personal affairs of a believer. He defines democracy as a system of governance that enforces a set of "limitations and conditions" on the head of state and government employees so that they work within "boundaries that the laws and religion of every nation determines". Akhund believes that modern secular laws complement traditional religion. He asserts that both religious rulings and the laws outside the scope of religion confront "state despotism". Constitutionalism is based on the idea of defending the "nation's inherent and natural liberties", and as absolute power corrupts, a democratic distribution of power would make it possible for the nation to live up to its full potential.

In 1925, Rezā Khan proclaimed himself shah of the country.  As part of his Westernization program, the traditional role of the ruling clergy was minimized; Islamic schools were secularized, women were forbidden to wear the hijab, sharia law was abolished, and men and women were desegregated in educational and religious environments.  All this infuriated the ultraconservative clergy as a class.  Rezā Khan's son and heir Mohammad Reza Pahlavi continued such practices. They ultimately contributed to the Islamic Revolution of 1978–79, and the Shah's flight from his country.

When Ayatollah Khomeini took power a month after the revolution, the Shah's anti-clerical measures were largely overturned, replaced by an Islamic Republic based on the principle of rule by Islamic jurists, velayat-e faqih, where clerics serve as heads of state and judges, veto legislation they consider un-Islamic and control who may run for president or parliament.  However, by the late 1990s and 2000s, anti-clericalism was reported to be significant in the Islamic Republic of Iran.

Demonstrators using slogans such as "The clerics live like kings while we live in poverty!" One report claims "Working-class Iranian lamented clerical wealth in the face of their own poverty," and "stories about Swiss bank accounts of leading clerics circulated on Tehran's rumor mill."

Indonesia 

During the fall of Suharto in 1998, a witch hunt in Banyuwangi against alleged sorcerers spiraled into widespread riots and violence. In addition to alleged sorcerers, Islamic clerics were also targeted and killed,  Nahdlatul Ulama members were murdered by rioters.

Certain branches of Freemasonry 

According to the 1913 Catholic Encyclopedia, Freemasonry was historically viewed by the Catholic Church as being a principal source of anti-Clericalism – especially in, but not limited to, historically Catholic countries.

See also

Age of Enlightenment
Agnosticism
Atheism
Anarchism
Anti-Catholicism
Anti-Christianity
Clericalism
Communism
Christian anarchism
Deism
Dechristianisation of France during the French Revolution
Denis Diderot
Dissolution of the Monasteries
Freethought
Laïcité
Left-wing politics
Liberalism
Nonsectarian
Relations between the Catholic Church and the state
Secular humanism
Secular liberalism
Secular state
Secularity
Secularization
Separation of church and state
Socialism
State atheism
Suppression of the Jesuits
Theocracy
Thomas Paine
Voltaire

Notes

Bibliography 
 
 .
 

 
 
 

 

 
 
 Gross, Michael B. The War Against Catholicism: Liberalism and the Anti-Catholic Imagination in Nineteenth-Century Germany (University of Michigan Press, 2004)
 
 

 
 

 

 
 

 
 
 
 
 

 
 .

 
 
 
AḴŪND ḴORĀSĀNĪ, Encyclopædia Iranica

Bayat, Mangol (1991). "Iran's First Revolution: Shi'ism and the Constitutional Revolution of 1905-1909". Studies in Middle Eastern History. Oxford, New York: Oxford University Press. ISBN 978-0-19-506822-1.

 
Liberalism and religion
Separation of church and state